Beardsley is a ghost town in Rawlins County, Kansas, United States.

History
The Greshamton post office was moved to Beardsley in 1889. The post office was discontinued in 1899, then reissued from 1906 to 1955.

References

Further reading

External links
 Rawlins County maps: Current, Historic, KDOT

Former populated places in Rawlins County, Kansas
Former populated places in Kansas
1889 establishments in Kansas
Populated places established in 1889